The Netherlands Football League Championship 1936–1937 was contested by 50 teams participating in five divisions. The national champion would be determined by a play-off featuring the winners of the eastern, northern, southern and two western football divisions of the Netherlands. AFC Ajax won this year's championship by beating Feijenoord, PSV Eindhoven, Be Quick 1887 and Go Ahead.

New entrants
Eerste Klasse East:
Promoted from 2nd Division: NEC Nijmegen
Eerste Klasse West-I:
Moving in from West-II: DHC Delft, DFC, SBV Excelsior, Sparta Rotterdam and Stormvogels
Promoted from 2nd Division: CVV Mercurius
Eerste Klasse West-II:
Moving in from West-I: HFC Haarlem, HBS Craeyenhout, Hermes DVS, KFC, Sparta Rotterdam and VSV

Divisions

Eerste Klasse East

Eerste Klasse North

Eerste Klasse South

Eerste Klasse West-I

Eerste Klasse West-II

Championship play-off

References
RSSSF Netherlands Football League Championships 1898-1954
RSSSF Eerste Klasse Oost
RSSSF Eerste Klasse Noord
RSSSF Eerste Klasse Zuid
RSSSF Eerste Klasse West

Netherlands Football League Championship seasons
Neth
Neth